This was the first edition of the tournament since 2008.

Vitalia Diatchenko won the title, defeating Naomi Osaka in the final, 7–6(7–5), 6–0.

Seeds

Main draw

Finals

Top half

Bottom half

External Links
 Main draw

Aegon Surbiton Trophy - Singles
Aegon Surbiton Trophy